The succession of bishops of Aarhus began when the bishop of Aarhus Reginbrand was first mentioned by Adam of Bremen as attending the Synod of Ingelheim.

Catholic See 

 Reginbrand, 948–988, Ordained by Adaldag of Hamburg-Bremen
Vacant (988–1060)
 Christian, 1060–??, Participated in one of the last Viking raids in 1069–70
 Ulfketil, 1102–1134, Fell in the Battle of Fotevik
 Eskil, ??–1157, Fell during raid to Wendland
 *Vacant (1157–1165)
 Svend I, 1165–1191, Founded the Cistercian abbey at Øm
 Peder Vognsen, 1191–1204, Initiated Aarhus Cathedral
 Skjalm Vognsen, 1204–1215
 Ebbe Vognsen, 1215–1224
 Peder Elevsøn, 1224–1246 
 Vacant (1246–1249)
 Peder Ugotsøn, 1249–1260
 Tyge, 1261–1272
 Peder IV, 1272–1276
 Tyge II, 1276–1288
 Jens Assersøn, 1288–1306
 Esger Juul, 1306–1310
 Esger Bonde, 1310–1325
 Svend II, 1325–1352
 Paul, 1352–1369
 Olufsen, 1369–1386
 Peder Jensen Lodehat, 1386–1395
 Bo Mogensen, 1395–1424
 Ulrik Stygge, 1424–1449
 Jens Iversen Lange, 1449–1482
 Ejler Madsen Bølle, 1482–1490
 Niels Clausen, 1490–1520
 Ove Bille, 1520–1536

After reformation 

 Mads Lang, 1537–1557
 Lauritz Bertelsen, 1557–1587
 Peder Jensen Vinstrup, 1587–1590
 Albert Hansen, 1590–1593
 Jens Gjødesen, 1593–1626
 Morten Madsen, 1626–1643
 Vacant (1643–1645)
 Jacob Matthiesen, 1645–1660
 Hans Brochmand, 1660–1664
 Erik Grave, 1664–1691
 Johannes Bræm, 1691–1713
 Johannes Ocksen, 1713–1738
 Peder Jacobsen Hygom, 1738–1764
 Poul Mathias Bildsøe, 1764–1777
 Jørgen Hee, 1777–1788
 Hector Frederik Janson, 1788–1805
 Andreas Birch, 1805–1829
 Peter Hans Mønster, 1829–1830
 Jens Paludan-Müller, 1830–1845
 Gerhard Peter Brammer, 1845–1881
 Bruun Juul Fog, 1881–1884
 Johannes Clausen, 1884–1905
 Fredrik Nielsen, 1905–1907
 Hans Sophus Sørensen, 1907–1916
 Thomas Schiøler, 1916–1931
 Fritz Bruun Rasmussen, 1931–1940 
 Skat Hoffmeyer, 1940–1962
 Kaj Jensen, 1962–1963
 Henning Høirup, 1963–1980
 Herlof Eriksen, 1980–1994
 Kjeld Holm, 1994–2015
 Henrik Wigh-Poulsen, 2015–present

See also
 Diocese of Aarhus
 Timeline of Aarhus

References

Aarhus
Aarhus
Bishops of Aarhus
Denmark religion-related lists